Harrisoniella hopkinsi is a species of phtilopterid louse that lives on and eats the feathers of albatrosses. The species was first described by W. Eichler in 1952.

They live mostly on the wing feathers, but are quite able to move if disturbed or if their host bird should die. There are usually fewer than half a dozen adult specimens found on a single host bird; low compared with other species of feather lice, which may number in the hundreds. Harrisoniella hopkinsi has been found on the feathers of the wandering albatross (Diomedea exulans) and the southern royal albatross (Diomedea epomophora).

References

External links 

 Harrisoniella hopkinsi and other feather lice discussed on Radio NZ Critter of the Week, 12 August 2016
 Images of Harrisoniella hopkinsi by photographer Rod Morris

Lice
Parasites of birds
Insects described in 1952